Boccole or dalle Boccole was a noble family of the Republic of Venice, active in the 14th century.

History
The activity of the two brothers Marino and Pietro shows the prospering of the family in the second quarter of the 14th century.

Members
Marino Boccole (fl. 1348)
Pietro Boccole (fl. 1348)
Franceschino Boccole (fl. 13XX)
Nicolò Boccole (fl. 1383), died without heirs.
Giovanni Boccole (fl. 1384–95).
Antonio Boccole (fl. 1403–22), conte ("count", governor) of Cattaro (Kotor) in 1420–22. His 1403 will has survived. He had two sons.

References

Sources

Republic of Venice families
14th-century Venetian people